Saint Helena competed in the 2014 Commonwealth Games in Glasgow, Scotland from 23 July to 3 August 2014. A team of 10 athletes represented the country in swimming, badminton and shooting. The return trip to Saint Helena takes 19 days.

Badminton

Singles

Doubles

Shooting

Swimming

Men

References

Nations at the 2014 Commonwealth Games
Saint Helena at the Commonwealth Games
2014 in Saint Helena, Ascension and Tristan da Cunha